Rebecca Joan Anderson is a Canadian author of fantasy and science fiction for children and teens, including the Faery Rebels and Ultraviolet series. Anderson currently lives in Stratford, Ontario.

Biography 
Anderson was born in Uganda in 1970, and went to school in New Jersey. Anderson is the daughter of a preacher, and has remained involved in the church as a pianist and a Bible study teacher. Anderson includes issues of Christian faith in some of her books, though Publishers Weekly states that she "generally handles her material without preaching." She is married and has 3 children.

Critical responses 
Kirkus Reviews says that Anderson is "an assured storyteller with a knack for creating memorable characters." Anderson has been praised for both series, with Knife (the first book in the Faery Rebels series) winning the Concorde Book Award in 2011 and nominated for a Carnegie Medal in 2009. In 2011, she was nominated for a Nebula Award for Ultraviolet. Ultraviolet was shortlisted for the Andre Norton Award in 2012. She has been reviewed in CM: Canadian Review of Materials and Canadian Children's Book News. Booklist has called Ultraviolet, a story about a young adult synesthete, "a natural grabber for teens."  In 2010 the Canadian Library Association gave Spell Hunter the Honor Book designation.

Selected works

Faery Rebels Series 
 Knife, Orchard (London, England), 2008, published as Spell Hunter, HarperCollins (New York, NY), 2009. Republished 2015 as "Knife" by Enclave Publishing / Third Day Books LLC (Phoenix, AZ)
 Rebel, Orchard (London, England), 2009, published as Wayfarer, HarperTeen (New York, NY), 2010. Republished 2015 as "Rebel" by Enclave Publishing / Third Day Books LLC (Phoenix, AZ)
 Arrow, Orchard (London, England), 2011, . First US publication 2016 (same title) by Enclave Publishing / Third Day Books LLC (Phoenix, AZ)

Flight and Flame Trilogy 
 Swift, Orchard (London, England), 2012,  First US publication by Enclave Publishing 2020
 Nomad, Orchard (London, England), 2014,  First US publication by Enclave Publishing 2021
 Torch, Enclave Publishing (Phoenix, AZ), 2021,

Ultraviolet Series 
 Ultraviolet, Carolrhoda Books, 2013, 
 Quicksilver, Carolrhoda Books, 2013,

Uncommon Magic Series 
 A Pocket Full of Murder, Atheneum Books for Young Readers, 2015, 
 A Little Taste of Poison, Atheneum Books for Young Readers, 2016,

References 

Canadian fantasy writers
Canadian women novelists
Canadian children's writers
People from Stratford, Ontario
Year of birth missing (living people)
Canadian science fiction writers
Women science fiction and fantasy writers
Living people
21st-century Canadian novelists
21st-century Canadian women writers